Udot is a heavily wooded minor island and municipality in Chuuk Lagoon, Chuuk State, the Federated States of Micronesia. The island measures 4 by 2.6 km (2.5 by 1.6 miles) and the population numbers 1774 (2000 FSM Census).

Notes

Islands of Chuuk State
Municipalities of Chuuk State